Air Georgia is a cargo airline from Georgia. It was founded in 2015 and commenced operations in August 2016 after receiving its first aircraft. The airline has its main hub at Tbilisi International Airport, and its fleet comprises one Boeing 747 aircraft.

History
Georgy Kodua is the founder and president of Air Georgia which was financed by Arab investors.

Fleet
As of August 2020 the Air Georgia fleet consists of the following aircraft:

See also
 List of airlines of Georgia (country)

References 

Airlines of Georgia (country)
2015 establishments in Georgia (country)
Airlines established in 2015